Sail Rock is a rock lying  northwest of Shag Island and  north of Heard Island. This rock, though positioned several miles too far westward, appears to have been first shown on an 1860 sketch map compiled by Captain H.C. Chester, American sealer operating in the area during this period. It was more accurately charted and named on an 1874 chart by the Challenger expedition.

Rock formations of Antarctica
Landforms of Heard Island and McDonald Islands